Putrajaya Botanical Garden is a botanical garden in Presint 1, Putrajaya, Malaysia. It was opened on 31 August 2001 and spans over an area of 93 hectares. The garden is divided into five sections, which are Explorer's Trail, Palm Hill, Floral Gardens, Sun Garden and Lakeside. It features facilities such as restaurant, car parks, bicycle rental and paddle boat rental. The garden is accessible by bus from Putrajaya/Cyberjaya ERL station.

See also
 List of tourist attractions in Putrajaya

References

2001 establishments in Malaysia
Botanical gardens in Malaysia
Geography of Putrajaya
Tourist attractions in Putrajaya